Derrick Etienne (born 11 August 1974) is a Haitian former professional footballer.

Career

Etienne played for the Richmond Kickers and Long Island Rough Riders. and internationally for the Haitian National Team. While with the Rough Riders, Etienne helped lead the club to a 1st place finish in the Atlantic Division and the D-3 Pro League National Championship in 2002. In the championship game against the Wilmington Hammerheads, the Rough Riders held a 1–1 tie until the 82nd minute, when Etienne scored the winning goal. In 2003 Etienne was named to the USL All League Team.

While with the Haitian National Team, he made appearances in various competitions, including the Gold Cup, Caribbean Cup, International Friendlies, and World Cup Qualifying.

Personal
He is the brother of Darrell Etienne and father of Darice Etienne, Derrick Etienne Jr., and Danielle Etienne.

Statistics

Honors

Club
Long Island Rough Riders
2002 USISL D-3 Pro League

References

External links
soccerstats.us

1974 births
Living people
Haitian footballers
Association football forwards
Haiti international footballers
Twin sportspeople
Haitian twins
Richmond Kickers players
Long Island Rough Riders players
VCU Rams men's soccer players
Expatriate soccer players in the United States
People from Cap-Haïtien